Ali Gharbi (born 21 March 1945) is a Tunisian boxer. He competed in the men's flyweight event at the 1972 Summer Olympics.

References

External links
 

1945 births
Living people
Tunisian male boxers
Olympic boxers of Tunisia
Boxers at the 1972 Summer Olympics
Place of birth missing (living people)
Flyweight boxers